Harris Kimberley Faulkner (born October 13, 1965) is an American newscaster and television host  who joined Fox News Channel in 2005. She anchors The Faulkner Focus, a daily daytime show, and hosts Outnumbered. Additionally, she hosts her own primetime political franchise called Town Hall America with Harris Faulkner. She has received six Emmy Awards, including the 2005 awards for Best Newscaster and Best News Special.

Early life 
Faulkner was born on October 13, 1965 at Fort McPherson in Atlanta, Georgia. Her father, retired Lieutenant Colonel Bob Harris, a United States Army officer and Army Aviator, was stationed at the base and had served three tours in Vietnam. Faulkner lived in different places as a child, including Stuttgart in West Germany.

Faulkner attended the University of California, Santa Barbara, and graduated with a B.A. in mass communications.

Career 
Faulkner's start was with LA Weekly, where she contributed as a freelance business writer for $50 per article. Faulkner started her television career with an internship at KCOP-TV in Los Angeles, doing small tasks, then moved to Greenville, North Carolina, to work as a reporter and anchor at WNCT-TV.

From 1992 to 2000, Faulkner worked for Kansas City's WDAF-TV  as an evening anchor. While in Kansas City, Faulkner was the victim of harassment and stalking by a former acquaintance who followed her from North Carolina.

Faulkner's next stop was at KSTP-TV in Minneapolis–Saint Paul, where she served as part of an evening anchor team. She left the station in July 2004.

Faulkner joined Fox News in 2005. She was a correspondent for the 2005 revival of  A Current Affair until its cancellation in October 2005.

Faulkner anchored her first solo network newscast Fox Report Weekend from 2011-2017. In addition to Midterm Election coverage 2018, Faulkner has substitute-anchored for Shepard Smith Shepard Smith Reporting and for Martha MacCallum The Story.  She also made frequent guest appearances on the night satire show Red Eye with Greg Gutfeld, prior to the departure of Gutfeld from that show.

In April 2014, Faulkner began working as one of the co-hosts on the daytime Fox News show Outnumbered. In 2017, she became the anchor of Outnumbered Overtime, which has more of a hard news format rather than a discussion format. In early 2021, she started her new show called The Faulkner Focus.

Honors and awards 
While at ABC's Minneapolis affiliate KSTP, Faulkner received four regional Emmy Awards, including Best Anchor three years in a row (2002, 2003, and 2004) and for anchoring a news special, "Eyewitness to War". In 1998, she was awarded the Amelia Earhart Pioneering Lifetime Achievement Award for her humanitarian efforts. In 2021, she was honored by Varietys 2021 New York Women's Impact Report for her 2020 interview with then-president Donald Trump after the murder of George Floyd.

Personal life 
Faulkner married former WCCO-TV reporter Tony Berlin in 2003. The couple have two daughters.

In September 2015, Faulkner sued Hasbro for $5 million, claiming a plastic hamster in its Littlest Pet Shop line was an unauthorized use of her name and likeness. Hasbro settled with Faulkner in October 2016, agreeing to cease production of the toy.

Published works

See also 
 Broadcast journalism
 New Yorkers in journalism

References

External links 
 
 Fox News biography
 Fox News Insider biography
 Premiere Speakers Bureau biography
 

1965 births
Emmy Award winners
African-American television personalities
Living people
University of California, Santa Barbara alumni
American television reporters and correspondents
People from Atlanta
People from Edgewater, New Jersey
Fox News people
Television anchors from Kansas City, Missouri
Television anchors from Minneapolis–Saint Paul, Minnesota
21st-century American journalists
21st-century African-American people
20th-century African-American people
Black conservatism in the United States